"What About Me?" is a song first recorded in 1984 as a trio by singers Kenny Rogers, Kim Carnes, and James Ingram. The song was written by Rogers, noted producer David Foster, and singer-songwriter Richard Marx, who would later achieve superstar status as a musician ("Right Here Waiting", "Now and Forever"). It was the lead single from Rogers' 1984 album of the same name.

Background and writing
Rogers has described "What About Me?" as "like a three-way love song...Everybody involved said 'Hey, what about me?' I think it's a beautiful record." Originally the male and female parts not sung by Rogers were to be performed by Lionel Richie and Barbra Streisand, but after Richie backed out of the project, Streisand did as well. The second proposed trio of singers was Rogers, Olivia Newton-John, and Jeffrey Osborne, but Newton-John began working on a duet with Barry Gibb of the Bee Gees and decided not to do both projects simultaneously. Osborne had a conflicting schedule as well, so the line-up of Rogers, Carnes, and Ingram was ultimately the one that recorded the song. Rogers, Olivia Newton-John and Ingram was recorded at Sunset Sound in the Summer of 1984 – Carnes came on later for unknown reasons

Charts

See also
List of number-one adult contemporary singles of 1984 (U.S.)

References

External links
Single release info at discogs.com

1980s ballads
1984 singles
Kenny Rogers songs
Kim Carnes songs
James Ingram songs
Songs written by Richard Marx
Songs written by David Foster
1984 songs
RCA Records Nashville singles
Songs written by Kenny Rogers
Vocal collaborations